is a Japanese musician, composer, arranger, record producer, pianist and keyboard player, based in Tokyo and Karuizawa.

Career 

Hirama works on advertisement film and soundtrack, producing original albums, offering songs for various artists, and playing instruments at recordings and lives.  Hirama is a central member of tangerine. which is a record producing group. He co-starred with a former erhu player from the Twelve Girls Band as a producer and a pianist at a concert held in Karuizawa 2016 and 2017.  Hiramas recent work is a song called Blue Star by The Idolmaster (Dancin' Blue, 2017).  The song was introduced as a live performance in front of a 10,000 person audience at a 2018 New Year concert held at Makuhari Messe Chiba, Japan.

Discography 

Total Production
Flavor Bossa Case (2006)
Flavor Bossa Case II (2006)
FLAVOR BOSSA CASE ORANGE STYLE (2007)
FLAVOR BOSSA CASE SAKURA  (2008)
FLAVOR BOSSA CASE TEARS (2008)
Login! (2009)
Plugin! (2009)
SPRING SWEET LOVE (2010)
Flavor Bossa Case BEST OF GROOVE STYLE (2011)
Flavor Bossa Case BEST OF MELLOW STYLE (2011)

Collaborations
Twilight Flavour (2005)
Aperitivo TOKYO (2006)
In The Morning BEST (2006)
Flavor Bossa Case BEST OF MELLOW and GROOVE (2007)
ViVi HOLIDAY STYLE selected by LENA FUJII (2008)
PLAY LOUD (2008)
memories...cafe & drive music (2009)
COLORFUL HARVEST (2009)
HOMMAGE Bossa Style non stop mix (2011)

Other appearances 
Lia
Shakou no oka (gift, 2005) composed, arranged
animation soundtrack
Curtain, heavenly bird (amaenaideyo!! kyarason DE katsu!!, 2006) composed, arranged
NO PLAN Uchimura Produce
CD-jingle (LAST PLAN, 2006) composed・arranged
super hero TV show soundtrack
time police Vecker Signa ending theme (2007) arranged
Ai Nonaka
koi no musium (2007) composed, arranged
Yui Horie
lovely everyday (2008) arranged
 Lia
SANDSTORM (new moon, 2008) composed
COLDFEET
TEN remixes(2009年) co-remix
TORTURED SOUL
TORTURED SOUL REMIXES JAPAN EDITION (2009) co- remix
Lena Fujii
Rainbow (2009) composed・arranged, produced
Ayane
Megane na Riyu (Megane na Kanojo ending theme,  2010) composed, arranged
KARA
Only for You (Super Girl, 2011) composed, arranged
KARA
Only for You (Super Girl JAPAN TOUR Special Edition, 2012) composed, arranged
Summers
Summers LIVE 9 soundtrack (2013) composed, arranged
real
LOVE CRAZY (2013) co- remix
Unfamiliar Friends Party
SILENCE IS GHOST (2013) co- remix
tupera tupera
picture book UNKO SHIRITORI promotion video (2014) composed, arranged, vocal
YOSHIKA
MY ANTHEM ~Sympathetic Resonance~ (2014) co- remix
Hanae
SHOW GIRL (2016) arranged, piano
 Summers
Summers LIVE 11 soundtrack (2017) composed, arranged
E-kids
E-kids Again 1234 Japan Edition (2017) produced, co- composed, arranged
kukatachii
Business of you (Inside, 2017)  remix
The Idolmaster
BLUE STAR (2017) composed, arranged
Iris
Ashitae (Gundam Build Divers ending theme, 2018) composed

Advertisement films 
Seven & i Holdings Co., Ltd. ''Seven & i Holdings" company sound logo
SMBC Consumer Finance Co., Ltd. "It's Promise" company sound logo
Honda Motor (China) Co., Ltd.  "FUNTEC" company sound logo
Domino's Pizza Japan, Inc. "Domino's Pizza" company sound logo

References

External links 
  Ryonosuke Hirama Columbia profile
  Ryonosuke Hirama  Universal  Music Japan profile
  Ryonosuke Hirama TSUTAYA

Year of birth missing (living people)
Japanese composers
Japanese male composers
Japanese male musicians
Japanese record producers
Living people